The George Orwell Memorial Prize was an annual prize awarded by Penguin Publishing for articles or essays on current political, cultural or social issues.

Penguin announced the founding of the Prize on 2 January 1976. The award for the first year was £500, with the winner chosen by a panel of five judges. Only articles that had been published in Britain during the past year were eligible for the Prize. The article also had to be sponsored by the editor of the publication that it appeared in. In 1977 the award was raised to £750.

Winners

Notes

1976 establishments in the United Kingdom
Awards established in 1976
British journalism awards
British literary awards